Glen Este High School was a public high school in Glen Este outside Cincinnati, Ohio, United States.  It was one of two high schools in the West Clermont Local School District, the other being Amelia High School. The four-year high school had an enrollment of approximately 1,200 students in grades 9–12 in 2012.

Glen Este High School was accredited by the Ohio Department of Education and the North Central Association of Colleges and Schools. The school was also a member of the Ohio Association of College Admissions Counselors and the National Association of College Admissions Counselors. It was one of the few schools in Greater Cincinnati that operated its own radio station, solely run by the students. Closed circuit radio KXKVO was organized as a club and operated from 1967 until 1972. In the fall of 2017 Glen Este merged with Amelia High School to become West Clermont High School.

Notable alumni
Keith Matthew Maupin, United States Army Staff Sergeant
Jayhawk Owens, former professional baseball player

References

External links
 West Clermont Local School District

High schools in Clermont County, Ohio
Defunct public high schools in Ohio
Defunct schools in Ohio
Educational institutions established in 1963
Educational institutions disestablished in 2017
1963 establishments in Ohio
2017 disestablishments in Ohio